Flatexdegiro AG is a German listed provider of financial technologies based in Frankfurt am Main and parent company of . The company was founded in July 1999 and has 10 locations in Germany (Andernach, Berlin, Düsseldorf, Hamburg, Kulmbach, Leipzig, Leverkusen, Neuss, Willich, Zwickau) and one location each in Bulgaria (Sofia), Austria (Vienna) and in the Netherlands (Amsterdam). At the end of 2021, the company had around 2 million customers and executed 91 million securities transactions.

History

Founded in 1999 as PRE.IPO AG, Flatex AG entered the market in 2006 with the online broker Flatex. The Kulmbacher was a co-founder of the stock market media AG and publisher of the market letter Der Aktionär Bernd Förtsch. In the summer of 2009, the IPO took place as Flatex AG,[2] whereby the term "flatex" is a so-called portmanteau word and is derived from the two English words flat for 'all-inclusive' and execution for 'execution/processing'. The customer pays a fixed amount for a securities transaction, regardless of volume. In 2014, Flatex AG was renamed FinTech Group AG. The FinTech Group was named "Bank of the Year" by the Oskar Patzelt Foundation in 2017. In August 2019, FinTech Group AG was renamed back to Flatex AG.

Acquisition of XCOM AG
The majority stake in XCOM AG, which was on the market as a software and system house from 1988, was taken over in March 2015 and merged with Flatex AG on August 31, 2017. With this acquisition, today's Flatexdegiro Bank AG was also transferred to the group.

Acquisition of DEGIRO BV
In December 2019, Flatex AG announced the purchase of the Dutch online broker Degiro (proper spelling DEGIRO). After the acquisition, Flatex planned to become the first and largest online broker in Europe and by the end of 2020 to serve more than one million customers who carry out over 35 million transactions annually and process more than 200 billion euros in transaction volume. The transaction to acquire Degiro was completed at the end of July 2020. With the takeover, the company was able to increase the number of customers to over one million. With the takeover, Degiro customers benefited from the deposit insurance of the former Flatex Bank and its banking license. After the takeover Degiro could also offer banking services. At the Annual General Meeting in October 2020, Flatex AG was renamed Flatexdegiro AG (own spelling flatexDEGIRO). In October 2020, Flatexdegiro was admitted to the Prime Standard by the Frankfurt Stock Exchange, followed two months later by the SDAX.

Measures against flatexDEGIRO Bank
On February 7, 2023, BaFin imposed a fine of EUR 1,050,000 on flatexDEGIRO Bank AG with a legally binding decision because the institute had violated banking supervisory regulations. In addition, additional capital requirements were imposed on flatexDEGIRO Bank AG and flatexDEGIRO AG as the parent company of the flatexDEGIRO AG financial holding group on September 8, 2022. The measures have been final since February 21, 2023.

References

External links
 Web site of Flatexdegiro AG
 Web site of Flatex Broker
 Web site of Degiro Broker

German companies established in 1999
Online brokerages